Andrey Dmitriyevich Arkhangelsky (December 8, 1879 – June 16, 1940) was a geologist. He was a professor at Moscow State University.  He was Corresponding Member of the Division of Physical-Mathematical Sciences since 1925, and Academician of the Division of Physical-Mathematical Sciences since 1929.

He won the Lenin Prize in 1928.

Memoria
A crater on Mars and Arkhangel'skiy Nunataks in Antarctica are named after him.

References

1879 births
1940 deaths
Burials at Novodevichy Cemetery
Geologists from the Russian Empire
Soviet geologists
Corresponding Members of the Russian Academy of Sciences (1917–1925)
Full Members of the USSR Academy of Sciences
Academic staff of Moscow State University